The Future of Go Summit was held in May 2017 by the Chinese Go Association, Sport Bureau of Zhejiang Province and Google in Wuzhen, Zhejiang, the permanent host of the World Internet Conference. It featured five Go games involving AlphaGo and top Chinese Go players, as well as a forum on the future of AI. It was Google’s biggest public event in partnership with the Chinese government since Google China's search engine was moved out of mainland China to Hong Kong due to the government censorship in 2010. It was seen as a charm offensive launched by Google toward Chinese officials, being part of effort to reopen China's market.

The version of AlphaGo used in this Summit was AlphaGo Master, using four TPUs on a single machine with Elo rating 4,858. DeepMind claimed that this version was 3-stones stronger in games of self-play against itself than the version used in AlphaGo v. Lee Sedol.

After winning its three-game match against Chinese grandmaster Ke Jie, the world's top Go player, AlphaGo was awarded professional 9-dan by Chinese Weiqi Association. DeepMind announced that AlphaGo would retire, and DeepMind would disband the team that worked on Go and spend their time exploring new AI in other areas instead of Go.  After the Summit,  DeepMind released 50 games AlphaGo played against itself.

Schedule
Ke Jie vs. AlphaGo. 23, 25 and 27 May, all of them from 10:30 – 17:30 UTC+8. 
Pair Go: Gu Li and AlphaGo vs. Lian Xiao and AlphaGo. Friday 26 May, 8:30 – 12:30, UTC+8.
Team Tournament: AlphaGo vs. Chinese team (Chen Yaoye, Mi Yuting, Shi Yue, Tang Weixing, Zhou Ruiyang). Friday 26 May, 13:30 – 18:30, UTC+8.

Games

Ke Jie vs AlphaGo

Google DeepMind offered 1.5 million dollars winner prizes for this match while the losing side took 300,000 dollars for participating in the three games. AlphaGo won all three games.

Pair Go

The pair Go game was played on 26 May morning. Gu Li, an eight-time world champion, and Lian Xiao, the current Chinese Mingren and Tianyuan titles holder, each had their own AlphaGo teammate, alternating moves in tag team style. The move sequence was Gu Li (black), Lian Xiao (white), AlphaGo (black), and AlphaGo (white).

After move 198, the black AlphaGo proposed resignation, but got rejected by its teammate Gu Li. The white AlphaGo and Lian Xiao finally won by resignation after move 220.

This pair Go game provided a glimpse of how human players might be able to use AI tools in the future, benefiting from the computer's insights while also relying on their own intuition. After the match, David Silver, the lead researcher for AlphaGo said: "Pair Go was a beautiful game. All four players made some brilliant and creative moves. It felt like four painters working together on a shared canvas, all with different styles, all combining together to make something truly beautiful."

Team Go

The team Go match was held on 26 May afternoon. In this five-on-one match, five world champion players, Chen Yaoye, Zhou Ruiyang, Mi Yuting, Shi Yue, and Tang Weixing (black), joined forces to play against AlphaGo (white). There was a two-and-a-half-hour set time limit for each side followed by three 60-second byo-yomi overtime periods. Consulting each other on every move, the human team approached the challenge in a light-hearted manner, obviously enjoying the experience of playing together. Chosen as the team leader, Zhou Ruiyang positioned the stones on the board during regular time. Tang Weixing put down the stones in overtime, almost working on his own, and finally resigned in the face of AlphaGo’s certain victory. Eric Schmidt, the Executive Chairman of DeepMind's parent company Alphabet, Inc. tweeted: "This speaks volumes about where AI is headed - human players are teaming up with AlphaGo to have even more fun with the game!".

White 54 is a surprising move to human players. After move 58, Ke Jie pointed out that White could play 60, but was teased by other professional players in the research room until AlphaGo actually played this move. Tan Xiao commented that it's difficult for Black to win after move 64.

Chinese coverage
The game was widely reported by Chinese media and became one of the hottest topics on social networks.
However, due to the instruction of the Chinese authorities, the state owned China Central Television cancelled the plan to live telecast the game, and live streaming on a number of Chinese websites was cut off. The only official live broadcast was on YouTube, which is blocked in China. The restrictions caused widespread complaints among Chinese netizens on the social platform Sina Weibo. Chinese media was instructed to play down the mention of Google or Google's products in their reports, as its services are blocked in China.

References

External links
AlphaGo at The Future of Go Summit, 23-27 May 2017 , at DeepMind's website
Official event page, The Future of Go Summit
AlphaGo China | DeepMind 

Go competitions in China
Computer Go games
Human versus computer matches
May 2017 sports events in Asia
2017 in Chinese sport
AlphaGo
2017 in go